Shahrokh, Shahrukh, Shahroze, or Shah Rukh is the name of a mythological bird in Iranian literature. It is built of two parts: Shah meaning a king, and Rukh (or Rogh, or Rokh), another enormous mythological bird. In the One Thousand and One Nights stories, Rukh helps Sinbad escape from a dangerous island.

Shah Rukh, therefore, means king of the Rokh. It may also be written as Shaahinrokh or Avestan Saeenrokh. (E.g., Iranian city of Shaahindezh or Saeendezh and also city of Sannadazh). This has been converted to saeem-rokh, then seem-rokh, seem-rogh and vulgarised as see-morgh. Seemorgh is also known in mystics’ ideas as the king of birds or God.

Soleiman Haim in his Persian-English Dictionary has translated Shahrokh as "The Great Rook" and according to "A Comprehensive Persian-English Dictionary" Shahrokh means "The horn of a rhinoceros; the rooks in chess; a title given to the sons of the nobility; name of a son of Timure."

References

Legendary birds
Persian legendary creatures
One Thousand and One Nights
Roc (mythology)